Huti is a village development committee (VDC) in Darchula District in the Mahakali Zone of western Nepal. At the time of the 1991 Nepal census it had a population of 2317 people living in 417 individual households. It is named after the village of Huti. The Brama Devta temple is located there at Huti-2 and is visited by many pilgrims.

References

External links
UN map of the municipalities of Darchula District

Populated places in Darchula District